Clifton Township, Kansas may refer to the following places:

 Clifton Township, Washington County, Kansas
 Clifton Township, Wilson County, Kansas

See also 
 List of Kansas townships
 Clifton Township (disambiguation)

Kansas township disambiguation pages